The 1974 Connecticut Huskies football team represented the University of Connecticut in the 1974 NCAA Division II football season.  The Huskies were led by second year head coach Larry Naviaux, and completed the season with a record of 4–6.

Schedule

References

Connecticut
UConn Huskies football seasons
Connecticut Huskies football